On Location is a series from HBO. The series premiered on New Year's Eve 1975 with a one-hour performance by Robert Klein and became a source for uncensored stand-up comedy performances from performers such as George Carlin, David Brenner, Redd Foxx, Rich Little, Robin Williams, Phyllis Diller, Buddy Hackett, Billy Crystal, Pat Cooper and others. In addition to showing select comedians, On Location featured comedy shows such as the annual Young Comedians Show and comedy club shows. From 1982 to 1986, a version of the "HBO In Space" program opening sequence was used to introduce the series.

HBO On Location episodes

Partial list of specials

See also
 HBO
 Standing Room Only

References

External links
 Early version introduction of HBO's On Location

HBO original programming
1976 American television series debuts
1970s American television series
English-language television shows